Mumtaz Ali Khan (1 August 1920 – 31 August 1990) was a Bangladeshi singer, lyricist, composer, collector of songs. He was awarded Ekushey Padak in 1981 by the Government of Bangladesh.

Early life and career
Khan was born in Manikganj to his parents Afsar Ali Khan and Bedoura Khatun.

Khan learnt classical music from Nisar Husain. He was enlisted as an artiste at Calcutta Station of All India Radio.

Khan tutored musicians like Leila Arjumand Banu, Abdul Alim, Ferdausi Rahman, Nina Hamid, Indramohan Rajbangshi and Meena Barua.

Personal life
Khan had 6 daughters. Including Pilu Momtaz, they all became musicians.

References

1920 births
1990 deaths
People from Manikganj District
Bangladeshi male musicians
Recipients of the Ekushey Padak
20th-century male musicians